Childers is a surname. Notable people with the surname include:
Alisa Childers (born 1975), American singer
Ambyr Childers (born 1988), American actress
Bob Childers (1946–2006), American country/folk singer-songwriter
Buddy Childers (1926–2007), American jazz trumpeter
Ernest Childers (1918–2005), American Army officer
Erskine Barton Childers (1929–1996), Irish UN civil servant
Erskine Hamilton Childers (1905–1974), 4th President of Ireland (1973–1974)
Hugh Childers (1827–1896), British and Australian Liberal statesman
Jason Childers (born 1975), American Major League baseball player
Lawrence Childers (born 1944), American politician
Mary Ann Childers, American television reporter
Marvin Childers (born 1961), American politician, lawyer, and lobbyist
Matt Childers (born 1978), American major League baseball player
Michael Childers (1784–1854), British Army officer of the Napoleonic era
Milly Childers (1866–1922), English painter
Molly Childers (1875–1964), American-born Irish writer
Naomi Childers (1892–1964), American silent film actress
Nessa Childers (born 1956), Irish Member of the European Parliament 
Rita Childers (1915–2010) First Lady of Ireland 
Robert Caesar Childers (1838–1876), British orientalist
Robert Erskine Childers (1870–1922), author and Irish nationalist
Robert L. Childers, Tennessee judge
Rodney Childers (born 1976), American NASCAR crew chief
Sam Childers (born 1962), American charity worker
Travis Childers (born 1958), United States Representative, 1st District of Mississippi
Tyler Childers (born 1991), American singer and songwriter
W. D. Childers (born 1933), American politician, Member of the Florida Senate

See also
Childers, Queensland, a town in the Bundaberg Region, Australia
Childers Palace Backpackers Hostel fire
Childers Hill, Tennessee, an unincorporated community in Hardin County, Tennessee
Childers reforms of the British army
Flying Childers, undefeated 18th century thoroughbred racehorse
HMAS Childers, a patrol boat of the Australian Navy
HMS Childers, the name of five ships of the Royal Navy
Karl Childers, the fictional protagonist of the film Sling Blade (1996)

English-language surnames
Surnames of English origin